Ivica Guberac (born 5 July 1988) is a retired Slovenian footballer who played as a midfielder.

References

External links
NZS profile 

1988 births
Living people
Sportspeople from Koper
Slovenian footballers
Slovenia youth international footballers
Association football midfielders
FC Koper players
NK Primorje players
Cagliari Calcio players
Aris Limassol FC players
FC Khimki players
FK Borac Banja Luka players
Floriana F.C. players
Slovenian expatriate footballers
Slovenian expatriate sportspeople in Italy
Expatriate footballers in Italy
Slovenian expatriate sportspeople in Cyprus
Expatriate footballers in Cyprus
Slovenian expatriate sportspeople in Russia
Expatriate footballers in Russia
Slovenian expatriate sportspeople in Bosnia and Herzegovina
Expatriate footballers in Bosnia and Herzegovina
Expatriate footballers in Malta
Slovenian PrvaLiga players
Cypriot First Division players
Russian First League players
Premier League of Bosnia and Herzegovina players
Maltese Premier League players
Slovenian Second League players